Semra Kebede (born June 18, 1987) is an Ethiopian beauty pageant titleholder, model, and actress, who was crowned Miss Ethiopia USA 2006 and later Deputy Miss Africa USA 2006.

Early life 
Semra Kebede was born on June 18, 1987 in Addis Ababa, Ethiopia. Her family moved to the United States when she was 10. She grew up in Houston, Texas and attended Alief Independent School District. Her parents belong to the Ethiopian Orthodox Church and she was raised in the Ethiopian Orthodox religion. Semra studied Economics at Emory University in Atlanta, Georgia and graduated with a bachelor's degree in 2009. Semra is fluent in Amharic

Titles 
Semra was crowned Miss Ethiopia USA 2006 at the official Miss Ethiopia USA pageant. This win qualified her to compete and represent her country of Ethiopia in the Miss Africa USA pageant and she later was crowned Deputy Miss Africa USA 2006.

Modeling 
Semra has participated in fashion shows for designers such as the Ethiopian musician and designer Chachi Tadesse and Ras Judah designer Rozy Negusie. She has also appeared in print for the later designer as well as for other Ethiopian beauty products.

References

External links 
 Miss Africa Pageant Photos
 Miss Africa Magazine

1987 births
Living people
People from Addis Ababa
Ethiopian female models
Emory University alumni
Ethiopian actresses
20th-century Ethiopian women
21st-century Ethiopian women
21st-century Ethiopian actresses